Dalcera haywardi is a moth in the family Dalceridae. It is found in northern Argentina. The habitat probably consists of warm temperate moist forests.

The wingspan is 34–38 mm. Adults are very similar to Dalcera abrasa, but with a scarlet spot in the anal area of the forewings. Adults have been recorded on wing in October.

References

Moths described in 1961
Dalceridae
Moths of South America